Hilli Government Polytechnic, is a government polytechnic located in Teor, Hili, Dakshin Dinajpur, West Bengal. This polytechnic is affiliated to the West Bengal State Council of Technical Education,  and recognised by AICTE, New Delhi. This polytechnic offers diploma courses in Electrical, Mechanical  and Civil Engineering.

References

External links
 

Universities and colleges in Dakshin Dinajpur district
Educational institutions established in 2016
2016 establishments in West Bengal
Technical universities and colleges in West Bengal